Greg "M Sipher" Sepelak is an American artist and writer for various Transformers comic ventures, primarily for Fun Publications. Sepelak also writes strategy guides for BradyGames.

At Fun Publications, Sepelak tends to partner with Trent Troop.

For eleven years, Sepelak organized the comedy event at official Transformers "BotCon" conventions, where various Transformers episodes and videos were ridiculed in the vein of Mystery Science Theater 3000.

References 

American comics artists
American comics writers
Living people
American male writers
American illustrators
21st-century American writers
Year of birth missing (living people)